The Vermillon River is a tributary of Chigoubiche River, flowing in the unorganized territory of Lac-Ashuapmushuan in the Le Domaine-du-Roy Regional County Municipality, in the administrative region of Saguenay–Lac-Saint-Jean, in province of Quebec, in Canada.

The Vermillon River valley is mainly served by forest roads which connect northward to route 167.

Forestry (mainly forestry) is the main economic activity in this valley; recreotourism activities, second, mainly because of the Ashuapmushuan Wildlife Reserve.

Geography 
The Vermillon River has its source at the mouth of Vermillon Lake (length:  triangular in shape;).

The mouth of Lake Vermillon is located in a forest zone in the unorganized territory of Lac-Ashuapmushuan, at:
  north-east of the course of the Trenche River;
  south of the mouth of the Vermillon river;
  south of the railway;
  south of the course of the Ashuapmushuan River.

  northward collecting two discharges (coming from the west) of small lakes, crossing Persée lake at the end of the segment, up to its mouth. Note: Lake Persée collecting from the northwest the discharge of Lake Danaé;
  towards the north, relatively in a straight line (occasionally forming small coils) in a steep-sided valley, collecting the discharge (coming from the south-east) of lakes Béost and Oiron, collecting the discharge of a set of lakes including Viau and Recourbé, forming a small hook to the east to collect the discharge (coming from the northeast) of Lake Andromeda, up to a bend in the river, corresponding to the discharge of the lake Moses (coming from the west);
  towards the east, forming a loop towards the north, then bend towards the south-east in order to circumvent a mountain, until a bend in the river (corresponding to the discharge (coming from the southwest) of Lake Fourdrain);
  first north to a bend in the river; forming a large loop to the east by collecting the discharge (coming from the southeast) of Vacillant lake, collecting nine streams (coming from the east), collecting the discharge (coming from the north) of Lake Melincourt; then curving towards the north-west collecting the discharge (coming from the east) of Lac des Pinson; collecting the discharge (coming from the southwest) of Lac Maillardet, crossing the Canadian National railway, to a bend in the river;
  eastward relatively in a straight line, gradually moving away from the railroad path and collecting the discharge (coming from the north of Lac des Ventis), and cutting the route 167, up to the Fernoël stream (coming from the south);
  forming a loop to the east at the start of the segment, then to the north relatively in a straight line but forming small coils, collecting the discharge (coming from the south-east) of the lakes Julien and Martin, by collecting the discharge (coming from the west) of lakes Buvilly and Centaure, by collecting the discharge (coming from the southeast) of lakes Poussard, Canivet and Croche, up to its mouth.

The Vermillon river flows on the south bank of the Chigoubiche River. This confluence is located upstream of a series of rapids, and at:

  west of the mouth of the Chigoubiche River;
  northwest of downtown Saint-Félicien.

Toponymy 
The toponym “Vermillon River” was made official on December 5, 1968, at the Place Names Bank of the Commission de toponymie du Québec.

See also 
 Ashuapmushuan Wildlife Reserve
 Chigoubiche River
 Ashuapmushuan River
 List of rivers of Quebec

References 

Rivers of Saguenay–Lac-Saint-Jean
Le Domaine-du-Roy Regional County Municipality